Laszlo Rabel (born László Rábel; September 21, 1937 – November 13, 1968) was a United States Army soldier and a recipient of the United States military's highest decoration—the Medal of Honor—for his actions in the Vietnam War.

Biography
Rabel fled Hungary following the 1956 revolution, and later immigrated to the United States. He joined the US Army from Minneapolis, Minnesota in 1965, and by November 13, 1968, was serving as a Staff Sergeant in the 74th Infantry Detachment (Long Range Patrol), 173rd Airborne Brigade. On that day, in Binh Dinh Province, South Vietnam, he smothered the blast of an enemy-thrown hand grenade with his body, protecting his fellow soldiers at the expense of his own life.

Rabel, aged 31 at his death, was buried in Arlington National Cemetery, Arlington County, Virginia.

Awards
Medal of Honor
Bronze Star Medal
Purple Heart with oak leaf cluster
Good Conduct Medal
National Defense Service Medal
Vietnam Service Medal
Republic of Vietnam Campaign Medal

Medal of Honor citation
Staff Sergeant Rabel's official Medal of Honor citation reads:

For conspicuous gallantry and intrepidity in action at the risk of his life above and beyond the call of duty. S/Sgt. Rabel distinguished himself while serving as leader of Team Delta, 74th Infantry Detachment. At 1000 hours on this date, Team Delta was in a defensive perimeter conducting reconnaissance of enemy trail networks when a member of the team detected enemy movement to the front. As S/Sgt. Rabel and a comrade prepared to clear the area, he heard an incoming grenade as it landed in the midst of the team's perimeter. With complete disregard for his life, S/Sgt. Rabel threw himself on the grenade and, covering it with his body, received the complete impact of the immediate explosion. Through his indomitable courage, complete disregard for his safety and profound concern for his fellow soldiers, S/Sgt. Rabel averted the loss of life and injury to the other members of Team Delta. By his gallantry at the cost of his life in the highest traditions of the military service, S/Sgt. Rabel has reflected great credit upon himself, his unit, and the U.S. Army.

See also

List of Medal of Honor recipients
List of Medal of Honor recipients for the Vietnam War

Notes

References

External links
USCIS biography

1937 births
1968 deaths
Hungarian emigrants to the United States
Military personnel from Minneapolis
United States Army non-commissioned officers
American military personnel killed in the Vietnam War
United States Army Medal of Honor recipients
Foreign-born Medal of Honor recipients
Burials at Arlington National Cemetery
Vietnam War recipients of the Medal of Honor
Hungarian-born Medal of Honor recipients
Deaths by hand grenade
United States Army personnel of the Vietnam War
Hungarian refugees
Refugees in the United States